This is a list of the National Register of Historic Places in outer Harris County, Texas.  It is intended to be a complete list of properties and districts listed on the National Register of Historic Places in outer portion of Harris County, Texas, United States, defined as outside the I-610 loop.  The locations of National Register properties and districts (at least for all showing latitude and longitude coordinates below) may be seen in a map by clicking on "Map of all coordinates."

Included is a cluster of seven current listings in the historic black neighborhood of Independence Heights, Houston.  Another cluster of three listings are NASA structures at the Lyndon B. Johnson Space Center.

Current listings
 

|}

Former listings

|}

See also
List of National Historic Landmarks in Texas
National Register of Historic Places listings in Texas
Recorded Texas Historic Landmarks in Harris County

References

External links
 University of Houston Digital Library: vintage photo of the Houston Cotton Exchange Building in the early 20th−century

outer Harris
National Register of Historic Places in Harris County, Texas